Twelve Caesars may refer to:
 The Twelve Caesars, a Roman history by Suetonius, or groups in art with the same individuals.
 Caesars (band), Swedish rock band